Justin Michael Hampson (born May 24, 1980) is an American former professional baseball pitcher. He played in Major League Baseball (MLB) for the Colorado Rockies, San Diego Padres and New York Mets.

Career

Colorado Rockies
Drafted by the Colorado Rockies in the 28th round of the 1999 MLB amateur draft, Hampson made his Major League Baseball debut with the Colorado Rockies on September 10, .

San Diego Padres
On August 10, 2008, Hampson pitched a scoreless fifth, sixth and seventh innings for the win after starter Chris Young gave up 7 runs in four innings in a 16-7 win over the Rockies. Hampson was released by the Padres on April 1, 2009.

Oakland Athletics
On May 27, 2009 Hampson signed a Minor League contract with the Oakland Athletics.

Independent baseball
Hampson pitched for the York Revolution and Long Island Ducks in 2010.

New York Mets
On February 16, 2011, Hampson signed a minor league contract with the New York Mets. On June 25, 2012, he was called up by the Mets after Vinny Rottino was designated for assignment. However, on July 4, he was designated for assignment after just three relief appearances. He was called up again September 4 along with five other players as part of the Mets' September callups and proceeded to pitch in 10 games over the remainder of the season, yielding two runs in 8 2/3 innings. Following the season, Hampson was outrighted off the Mets' 40-man roster, and he declared free agency.  He signed a minor league contract with the Mets on February 18, 2013.

References

External links

1980 births
Living people
Baseball players from Illinois
Colorado Rockies players
San Diego Padres players
New York Mets players
Major League Baseball pitchers
Portland Rockies players
Tri-City Dust Devils players
Asheville Tourists players
Tulsa Drillers players
Visalia Oaks players
Colorado Springs Sky Sox players
Portland Beavers players
Lake Elsinore Storm players
Sacramento River Cats players
Long Island Ducks players
York Revolution players
Buffalo Bisons (minor league) players
Las Vegas 51s players
Southwestern Illinois Blue Storm baseball players